Rear Admiral Erhard Martin Kramer   was a South African Navy officer who served as Deputy Chief of Staff, SADF.

World War 2

He joined the navy in 1943 after initial six weeks training at Pollsmoor as a seaman. He served on HMSAS Crasula, HMSAS Southern Maid, HMSAS Africana throughout the war.

South African navy career

In 1946 he attended the first post war Lieutenant's Qualifying Course at HMS Unite. He served as First Lieutenant on the SAS Good Hope. Naval Attaché in London, Senior Officer South African Submarines. Chief of Naval Staff Personnel and finally Deputy Chief of Staff SADF in 1976.

Awards and decorations

See also

List of South African admirals

References

South African admirals
1924 births